This is a list of dances of the Romani people.

Asia Minor & Turkey
Roman Havasi:
It is a type of mainly Turkish folkloric dance from where has been adapted from, with the main base and elements of Byzantine music.

Balkans, Hungary, and Romania

Čoček, a dance originating from Ottoman military bands that was later adopted by Roma in the Balkans

Cale Gitanos & Flamenco (Spain)
Flamenco

Egypt & Ghawazi

Belly dance

Russia & Ruska Roma
Russian Romani dance is characterized by gradual speed-up of music and movements. Female dance includes wide hand waves with the skirt and shoulder shakes. Male dance traditionally includes complex tap dance and patting knees, shoulders, and hips.

Related groups
Groups of the Middle East and India also known as gypsies:

Indian gypsies (Banjara and Domba groups): Sapera

See also
 Romani society and culture

References

European dances
 
Middle Eastern dances